Namo Narain Meena (born 24 December 1943) is an Indian politician belonging to the Indian National Congress from the state of Rajasthan. He was a member of the 14th Lok Sabha representing the Sawai Madhopur constituency and of the 15th Lok Sabha representing the Tonk-Sawai Madhopur constituency. He served as the Minister of State in the Minister of Environment and Forests in the UPA-I government between 2004 and 2009 and as the Minister of State in the Department of Expenditure, Banking and Insurance of the Ministry of Finance in the UPA-II government between 2009 and 2014.

Police career 
Namo Narain Meena served as an Indian Police Service officer of the 1969 batch of Rajasthan cadre. 
He started his career as an Assistant Superintendent of Police and served between 1969 and 1973. He further served as Superintendent of Police between 1973 and 1987, Deputy Inspector General of Police between 1987 and 1993, Inspector General of Police between 1993 and 1999, and retired as Additional Director-General of Rajasthan Police serving between 1999 and 2003. Following his retirement, he was appointed as a member of the Rajasthan State Human rights Commission in 2003 and remained as a member until his resignation on 22 March 2004.

During his long and illustrious career as an IPS officer, he was awarded with the prestigious Presidential Police Medal (PPM) and the President's Distinguished Service Medal (PDSM).

Political career
After resigning as a member of the RSHRC, Namo Narain Meena joined the Indian National Congress party and was nominated to contest from the Sawai Madhopur constituency of Rajasthan in the 2004 general election. He defeated sitting member of parliament and union minister Jaskaur Meena by a margin of 1,11,163 votes. Following his election, he was inducted into the first council of ministers under the premiership of Manmohan Singh as a Minister of State in the Minister of Environment and Forests on 22 May 2004 and served until 23 May 2009.

In the 2009 general election, he contested from the Tonk-Sawai Madhopur constituency and defeated his nearest rival and Bharatiya Janata Party candidate Kirori Singh Bainsla by a thin margin of 317 votes. Following his re-election, he was re-appointed to the union council of ministers. He was appointed as the Minister of State in the Ministry of Finance on 28 May 2009 and remained in office till 26 May 2014.

He was nominated by the Indian National Congress to contest from the Dausa constituency in the 2014 general election, however he was defeated by the BJP candidate and his brother Harish Meena who later joined the Congress Party in 2018. He contested from the Tonk-Sawai Madhopur seat in the 2019 general election and was defeated by sitting MP and BJP candidate Sukhbir Singh Jaunapuria.

Personal life
Namo Narain Meena is married to Kesar Meena and has a son and four daughters. He is the brother of Harish Meena who defeated him in 2014 from the Dausa Lok Sabha seat and later joined the Congress party in 2018 and is currently serving as a member of the Rajasthan Legislative Assembly.

Awards
 President's Police Medal
 President's Distinguished Service Medal

References

External links
 Meena Society

1943 births
Rajasthani politicians
Rajasthani people
Indian National Congress politicians
Living people
Indian police officers
India MPs 2004–2009
Union ministers of state of India
People from Sawai Madhopur district
India MPs 2009–2014
Lok Sabha members from Rajasthan